Pedro Solbes Mira (31 August 1942 – 18 March 2023) was a Spanish economist. He was the president of FRIDE, Madrid-based think tank.

Life and career
Solbes was born in Pinoso on 31 August 1942.

While independent in the sense of not being affiliated to any party, his various ministerial roles in Spain have always been within Socialist Workers' Party cabinets. From 1985–1991, he was third 3rd secretary of state for the European Communities. He was agriculture and fisheries minister (1991–1993) and finance minister (1993–1996) in Felipe González's cabinets, also MP representing Alicante for the same party until 1999.

Appointed by Spanish premier José María Aznar (of the main competing party, the People's Party) Solbes was a European commissioner for economic and monetary affairs in the European Commission presided by Romano Prodi (the Prodi Commission).

Then Solbes served as second vice president and minister of economy and finance in the government of José Luis Rodríguez Zapatero, which he held from 2004–2009.

Solbes died from cancer on 18 March 2023, at the age of 80.

Other activities
 African Development Bank (AfDB), ex-officio member of the Board of Governors (2004–2009)
 Asian Development Bank (ADB), ex-officio member of the Board of Governors (2004–2009)
 European Bank for Reconstruction and Development (EBRD), ex-officio member of the Board of Governors (2004-2009)
 European Investment Bank (EIB), ex-officio member of the Board of Governors (2004–2009)

Decorations
  Collar of the Order of Civil Merit (24 April 2009)
  Grand Cross of the Order of Charles III (10 May 1996)
  Commander by Number of the Order of Isabella the Catholic (30 May 1985)

References

External links
El Mundo information on Pedro Solbes
Solbes ordered to sell almost half of the gold reserves from the Spanish central bank. One year later, the gold once was at 1,000 $ 

1942 births
2023 deaths
People from Alicante
Agriculture ministers of Spain
Economy and finance ministers of Spain
Spanish Socialist Workers' Party politicians
Spanish European Commissioners
Commanders by Number of the Order of Isabella the Catholic
Recipients of the Order of the Cross of Terra Mariana, 1st Class
Collars of the Order of Civil Merit
Grand Crosses of the Order of the Lithuanian Grand Duke Gediminas
Grand Crosses of the Order of Christ (Portugal)
Members of the 6th Congress of Deputies (Spain)
Members of the 9th Congress of Deputies (Spain)
Deputy Prime Ministers of Spain
Secretaries of State of Spain